The Barack Obama Presidential Center is a planned museum, library and education project in Chicago to commemorate the presidency of Barack Obama, the 44th president of the United States. The center will also include community and conference facilities and will house the nonprofit Obama Foundation.

The center's work includes digitizing the Barack Obama Presidential Library with the National Archives and Records Administration (NARA), to create the first fully digitized presidential library. The Library is administered by NARA, which will preserve hardcopies of documents at a separate NARA facility; however, many will be loaned to the Presidential Center for display.

The center will be located in Jackson Park on the South Side of Chicago, adjacent to the University of Chicago campus. The university provides planning, support, engagement and programming. Included within the center's plans is a new branch for the Chicago Public Library.

Federal review ended in December 2020, with final completion in 2021. Construction began in August 2021.

Board and staff 

The Obama Foundation board includes Chairman Marty Nesbitt, a close friend from Chicago; J. Kevin Poorman, president and CEO of PSP Capital Partners; David Plouffe; Obama's half-sister Maya Soetoro-Ng; venture capital financier John Doerr; Studio Museum in Harlem Director and Chief Curator Thelma Golden; fundraiser and former White House Social Secretary Julianna Smoot; investment managers John Rogers and Michael Sacks; and former Governor of Massachusetts Deval Patrick. Barack Obama has a home in Hyde Park. The foundation was formally established in January 2014.

Louise Bernard, outgoing Director of Exhibitions at NYPL, was named director of the Museum of the Obama Presidential Center in May 2017. Michael Strautmanis became the vice-president of civic engagement for the foundation in 2016.

Site selection
In 2014 the Obama Foundation released details for institutions interested in being the location of the center.

The foundation ultimately received bids from four institutions:
Columbia University (New York City)
University of Chicago (Chicago)
University of Illinois at Chicago (Chicago)
University of Hawaiʻi at Mānoa (Honolulu)

In May 2015 the foundation's board announced it had decided to build the center in partnership with the University of Chicago. Obama taught constitutional law at the University of Chicago Law School from 1992 to 2004.

After the foundation's board had selected to build the center in partnership with the University of Chicago they began deciding between two possible locations, Washington Park and Jackson Park. They ultimately selected Jackson Park.

In 2018, the Obama Foundation released the proposed bid by the University of Chicago, and the three other universities. The 2014 bid revealed that the University of Chicago included various plans, such as combining the golf courses at South Shore and Jackson Park into a single “world class facility,” and the closing of Cornell Drive and other streets in the vicinity of Jackson Park in order to improve the connecting green space for museums located in a nearby area known as "Museum Campus South".

Planning and design
The University of Chicago, the University of Illinois at Chicago, the University of Hawaii, and Columbia University submitted proposals to host the institution. In May 2015, the Barack Obama Foundation and Chicago mayor Rahm Emanuel announced that the foundation and the Barack Obama Presidential Center would be located in Chicago's South Side, and would be built in partnership with the University of Chicago. Both the former president and his wife Michelle Obama stressed the importance of Chicago's South Side as an influence in their own lives. She said, "One of my greatest honors is being a proud Chicagoan, a daughter of the South Side. I still lead with that descriptor. I wear it boldly and proudly like a crown."

A design advisory committee assisted in the selection of the architects. Members of the committee included sculptor Don Gummer (the husband of actress Meryl Streep); Ed Schlossberg of ESI Design (husband of Caroline Kennedy, the former U.S. ambassador to Japan); Fred Eychaner, a Chicago radio station owner and Democratic financier; and Architectural Digest magazine editor Margaret Russell. Seven architectural firms were announced as finalists in December 2015 from an initial list of 140 applicants: John Ronan Architects, Adjaye Associates, Diller Scofidio + Renfro, Renzo Piano Building Workshop, SHoP Architects, Snøhetta, and Tod Williams Billie Tsien Architects.

In June 2016, the foundation chose New York-based Tod Williams Billie Tsien Architects and Chicago-based Interactive Design Architects to jointly lead the design and engineering of the center. For the exhibition design, Ralph Appelbaum Associates, which worked on the National Museum of African American History, will lead a team including Civic Projects, Normal, and several local artists. The landscape architect is Michael Van Valkenburgh Associates, with Site Design Group, and Living Habitats. Lakeside Alliance, which includes Turner Construction and a consortium of local African-American owned firms: Powers & Sons Construction, UJAMAA Construction, Brown & Momen, Safeway Construction, and Kates Security Services will build the center.

Two parks near the University of Chicago's campus, Jackson Park and Washington Park, were considered. On July 29, 2016, the foundation announced the selection of portion of Jackson Park in the Woodlawn neighborhood. Jackson Park, designed by landscape architect Frederick Law Olmsted for the 1893 World's Columbian Exposition, already houses the Museum of Science and Industry and a golf course.

The other buildings, a library building and a forum building, will be a single story. The latter building will feature an auditorium, a restaurant, and a public garden. In 2018, the center announced an agreement to place a Chicago Public Library branch within the complex.

The unveiled plan incorporates the Jackson Park end of Midway Plaisance from the north (which would be readapted as a circular green space surrounding a water basin), and the entirety of the park's hockey field and adjoining parkland to the south, where the main buildings and new park landscaping are to be sited. As part of a wider plan to reclaim parkland and improve park safety, the project also necessitates the closure, between 60th and 67th streets, of South Cornell Drive, a 6-lane thoroughfare that runs along the western park lagoon and the park's golf course from Midway Plaisance to South Shore. Without improvements to other roadways that will accommodate local traffic, these closures will result in nine intersections in the area to operate over capacity causing substantial traffic delays. These infrastructure changes would not be paid for by the Obama Foundation, and would require government funding, expected to cost the city $175 million.

Local reaction

Community Benefits Agreement
The Obama Library South Side Community Benefits Agreement Coalition, a coalition of 19 community and activist groups, is seeking a community benefits agreement to require that the Obama Foundation, in partnership with the City of Chicago, set aside jobs for residents in the local communities, protect low-income housing and home owners, support and create Black businesses, and strengthen neighborhood schools. Some residents have concerns about rising property taxes and rents that could displace many of the low-income Black residents. Recent rent increases for residents living directly across from the site escalated concerns of displacement of residents, particularly those who have fixed incomes, and has drawn protests against local Aldermen who are in opposition of a community benefits agreement. As of 2018, the Obama Foundation has so far refused to consider a community benefits agreement.

The foundation has announced plans for community hiring. An economic impact assessment estimates that about 28% of the 4,945 short-term construction jobs would go to South Side residents, with the remainder to the rest of Cook County. About 2,175 of the 2,536 long-term jobs would to go South Side residents, with the remainder to residents in rest of Cook County. It is estimated that the long-term jobs will bring in about $104 million in annual income to Cook County residents, or about $41,000 per job.

In July 2019, local aldermen Jeanette Taylor and Leslie Hairston introduced an ordinance aimed at protecting affordable housing near the development. The ordinance would require 30% of new units built in a 2-mile radius of the development to be affordable and offer right of first refusal for nearby tenants, among other benefits. The ordinance earned support from nearly 30 aldermen in Chicago City Council. In January 2020, Mayor Lori Lightfoot's administration announced that it would support a scaled-back version of a Community Benefits Agreement ordinance, but Taylor re-iterated support for the original ordinance.

In July 2020, the Lightfoot administration and aldermen Taylor agreed on a compromise ordinance that went further than the administration's earlier proposal. The compromise ordinance would require that 30% of units on 52 city-owned lots in Woodlawn be reserved for residents making between 30% and 50% of the Area Median Income, that any building refinanced through the Preservation of Existing Affordable Rentals program must reserve 10% of units for those making less than 30% of the AMI and 10% for those making less than 50% of the AMI, that the city's Housing Department request $675,000 in federal funds to support a local program to promote homeownership among current residents, and that eligibility restrictions be loosened for Woodlawn's Home Improvement Grant Program. The compromise was reached after negotiations between the administration, aldermen Taylor and Hairston, the CBA Coalition, and other community groups. Taylor called the compromise ordinance a "step in the right direction" and, along with members of the CBA coalition, called for further action.

Public land
The nonprofit group Friends of the Parks opposes the loss of parkland to build the center and had threatened a lawsuit to block development. In May 2018, the preservationist group "Protect Our Parks" filed a lawsuit, to prevent the part of Jackson Park, which dates from 1893, from being taken from the public and given to a private entity. Mayor Emanuel was critical of the lawsuit. Later that month, the plan to build the center was approved by the Chicago Plan Commission.

In early August 2018, the Chicago Park District began cutting trees to relocate park facilities, with the most notable being the Jackson Park athletic field. On September 17, 2018, the Chicago Park District suspended its construction related to the Center following meetings with the National Park Service and the Federal Highway Administration. On September 18, 2018, it was announced that the center will be owned by the city of Chicago once completed and that the Obama Foundation will not receive the tax-based operating or capital support, nor the perpetual leases which the 11 other museums in the city parks obtain.

Chicago Mayor Rahm Emanuel submitted two ordinances to the Chicago City Council on September 20: the first would grant the Obama Foundation a 99-year lease on the Jackson Park site for $10.00 with various restrictions on the foundation's use, in return for the foundation's financial responsibility for maintaining and operating the city-owned project; the second allows the city to plow under Cornell Drive from 59th Street to Hayes Drive in order to reconfigure this area as green space. The Chicago Department of Planning and Development (DPD) ordinance amended a 2015 agreement with the park district concerning the Obama Presidential Center. Under the new ordinance, the Presidential Center will comply with the Museum Act's free admission days requirements. Parking fees for the center will also be regulated so they are consistent with the rates charged at the Museum of Science and Industry or in the North Garage adjacent to the Field Museum. The ordinance will also ensure that these parking fees may solely be used to finance the center's operations, maintenance, management, and endowment funding. On October 31, 2018, the Chicago city council unanimously approved the new proposals for the Obama Presidential Center. Mayor Emanuel afterwards read a letter of thanks written by former President Obama.

On October 24, 2018, U.S. District Judge John Robert Blakey held a status conference in the lawsuit filed by the group Protect Our Parks to prevent construction in Jackson Park. Blakey indicated that both sides want a quick resolution and the court will not delay the lawsuit. The city informed the court that they intend to seek a motion to dismiss after action by the City Council. Discovery continued during the next few months. On November 23, 2018, a motion was filed by the city of Chicago to dismiss the Protect Our Parks lawsuit. This request was denied on February 19, 2019 by Judge Blakey, allowing the lawsuit to proceed. On June 11, 2019, Judge Blakey ruled on the parties' cross-motions for summary judgment and granted judgment in favor of the City and against Protect our Parks, dismissing the lawsuit to block construction of the Obama Presidential Center in Jackson Park. The case was appealed to the U.S. Supreme Court in August 2021, which denied the requested injunction against the City.

Other reactions
Some University of Chicago faculty members signed a letter stating concerns about the design, raised questions about the estimated cost of transportation improvements, and stated that the plan is an "object-lesson in the mistakes of the past". A counter-letter in support of the Obama Center was signed by other faculty in response. The independent campus student newspaper, The Chicago Maroon wrote an editorial in support of the center that criticized the concerns raised by some faculty.

Construction and fundraising

Construction of the center was originally expected to begin in late 2018 and be completed in 2020 or 2021. A federal review of the project began in late 2017, responding to the local criticism and attempting to assess whether the project affects Jackson Park's status on the National Register of Historic Places. This review will likely determine the start date of construction if the plan is approved. Tod Williams Billie Tsien Architects released the concept design for the center in 2017. The architects said in February 2017 that construction of the center's museum and library would likely approach $300 million, and that the center would likely need an endowment of $1.5 billion. In 2017, Obama reportedly was set to engage in a major fundraising effort for the center. On July 27, 2018, the Obama Foundation announced that groundbreaking for the center would be delayed until sometime in 2019, and the center would not open in 2021, as was initially planned.

The foundation's 2017 annual report, and its 2017 IRS filing, show that the Obama Foundation raised $232.6 million, on expenses of $23 million. The year after Obama left office was the first year the foundation lifted a cap on donations. While it lists its donors on its website, it no longer specifically links donors to exact amounts. While the Chicago city government has not promised that the foundation's endowment details will be disclosed publicly, its agreement with the foundation requires that the foundation may not proceed with construction of the center until the building endowment is secured. On June 3, 2019, it was announced that a $5 million grant had been issued to the city of Chicago by the MacArthur Foundation for plans to build the new Chicago Public Library branch at the site of the proposed Obama Presidential Center. Construction began in August 2021. On September 28th, 2021, the Obamas, Illinois Governor J.B. Pritzker and Lightfoot participated in the groundbreaking ceremony.

In November 2022, construction of the library was temporarily halted for several days, after a noose was found on site.

Obama presidential documents and artifacts
The papers and artifacts from the Obama administration are being stored and processed inside a facility in suburban Hoffman Estates, northwest of Chicago's O'Hare International Airport. The records are to be digitized and stored in existing NARA facilities. By law, they are subject to Freedom of Information Act requests beginning in 2022.

Federal review
The federal government began a review of this project in 2017 because of Jackson Park's historic designation and potential changes to the roadways in and around the park. The review concluded four years later in 2021, and some design changes were made to project to meet objections raised in the review.

In May 2018, the City of Chicago agreed to lease the land, 19.3 acres, to the OPC for 99 years. Once the construction is completed, the City of Chicago will own the center, per that 2018 city council agreement, reported in 2021 and also in 2018. The present mayor of Chicago has concerns for homeowners in the area, leading the City Council to agree to spend funds to keep people in their homes or aid them in buying other homes.

Concerns about gentrification of the neighborhood around the OPC and Jackson Park led to an agreement in August 2020 regarding home improvement funds for homes in Woodlawn. "In July, city officials negotiated a deal that will require developers to include affordable housing for projects on city-owned property in Woodlawn. The agreement, worked out with residents and the local alderman, will also provide up to $20,000 in funding for home improvement work to some homeowners."

Those who favor this project see it as a huge investment in the South Side, with the new public library branch, as well as the Obama Presidential Center itself, immediate benefits in jobs and when the project is completed it is expected to be a draw for tourists as well as an asset to the people in the neighborhood. They anticipate construction beginning in August 2021. Opponents appealed the plans, but lost in a federal court. They then appealed the decision to the U.S. Supreme Court, which in August 2021 refused to block the construction. Site construction began in August and a formal groundbreaking ceremony was held on September 28, 2021.

See also
 Presidential Records Act

References

External links

Barack Obama Presidential Library
Builder website for the Obama Center

Obama
Barack Obama
Presidential museums in Illinois
Proposed buildings and structures in Illinois
Museums in Chicago
Tourism in Chicago
University of Chicago
South Side, Chicago
Proposed museums in the United States